Tom Jones Live in Las Vegas is a live album recorded at The Flamingo Hotel in Las Vegas, Nevada during the summer of 1969, and released in November 1969.

Performed and recorded during one of the peaks of his popularity, due to his TV series, This is Tom Jones (from 1969 to 1971) and several hit singles in the late 1960s ("It's Not Unusual", "What's New Pussycat?", "Green, Green Grass of Home", "Love Me Tonight"), Tom Jones and his accompanying band, led by Johnnie Spence, gave a tight and highly energetic performance.  Jones' band featured some of the top studio musicians of the day, including Big Jim Sullivan on guitar and Chris Slade (The Firm, AC/DC) on drums.  Jones acknowledged these musicians to the audience at the beginning of the sixth track, "Danny Boy" - stating "I brought with me from England three of the finest musicians that we have there...on drums, we have Chris, on bass, we have John, and on lead guitar, we have Jimmy."  Typically a harsh critic of inferior music, Buddy Rich, on The Mike Douglas Show in 1971, stated "The band that plays behind Tom Jones is one of the great bands of all time."

The last track on Side 1, "I'll Never Fall in Love Again", is the 45 single released in 1967, but in a slightly different mix and has applause overdubbed in the studio. The reason for the inclusion of this track is because it had never previously been on a Jones album.  

This record was another bonus to Jones' career, peaking at #2 in the UK and #3 in the US. It remains his highest charting album in the United States.

Track listing

Personnel 
 Tom Jones – lead vocals
 Johnnie Spence – conductor, arranger
 John Rostill – bass guitar
 Big Jim Sullivan – lead guitar
 Chris Slade – drums
Technical
Terry O'Neill - photography

References 

Tom Jones (singer) albums
Albums recorded at the Flamingo Las Vegas
1969 live albums
albums produced by Peter Sullivan (record producer)